The Datsun Cherry (チェリー), known later as the Nissan Cherry, was a series of subcompact cars which formed Nissan's first front-wheel drive supermini model line.

The Cherry featured the front-engine, front-wheel-drive layout. The Cherry line includes the E10 and F10. Nissan's direct successor was the Nissan Pulsar worldwide.

In Japan, the Cherry was exclusive to Nissan Cherry store locations.

On the UK market, it debuted just before the company's surge in sales, which saw it sell just over 6,000 cars in 1971 and more than 30,000 the following year. Although its successor was launched in 1974, such was the original model's popularity on the UK market that it was not replaced there until 1976.

Background 
Originally, before combining with Nissan Motors, the Prince Motor Company plan of development was to mass-produce a front-engine, front-wheel drive car. Subsequent to the Prince and Nissan merger of 1966, the Cherry was released in 1970 as Nissan's first front-wheel drive car instead. In Asian markets there was also a "Cherry Cab" cabover truck model (C20), which was closely related to the Nissan Sunny — it was also marketed as the "Sunny Cab".

First generation (E10; 1970–1977) 

The E10 generation featured four-wheel independent suspension.

The E10 was fitted with two varieties of inline four-cylinder Nissan A-series OHV engines:
  A10
  A12

Although the car used a Nissan engine, the powertrain dated back to Prince's original concept - which was in essence a copy of the "transmission-in-sump" layout pioneered by the British Motor Corporation in the Mini.  Consequently, this gave the E10 a very distinctive transmission whine which was characteristic of this mechanical configuration.

The Japanese domestic market Cherry X-1 model featured twin-carburetted A12T engine with dual-sidedraft Hitachi carburettors.

In Europe, the A10-engined E10 Cherry was called Datsun 100A (the Datsun brand being used in place of Nissan in the European market at that time) or Datsun 120A (A12, but this engine was only available with the coupé body style or as a semi-automatic version of the ordinary car available in 1978). The names "Cherry" and "Datsun 1000" were also used in advertising, however the Datsun 1000 name was associated with the early Nissan Sunny and Nissan Bluebird. The Cherry was introduced in Japan at a specially established dealership sales channel called Nissan Cherry Shop, whereas the Sunny was sold at Nissan Satio Shop, and the Bluebird was sold at the Nissan Bluebird Shop. As the Cherry F-II successor flagged in the market, the somewhat smaller E10 Cherry continued to be sold up until 1977 in many places.

With the launch of the Cherry in 1971, Datsun's prominence in the UK market grew. In the early 1970s, as the British auto-industry faltered, Datsun led the charge of Japanese auto-manufacturers rapidly gaining market share in the UK. Britain's Motor magazine polled readers about their cars, including, in February 1973, those who owned E10 Cherrys. The question given greatest prominence was the final one which asked whether or not respondents would buy another car of the same model: 76 percent of Cherry owning respondents answered "yes", which was the top score for this question achieved by any model to date, and beat even the 66 percent "yes" score given by owners of the previous leader, the Volkswagen Beetle, at the time well known in the UK for its owners' brand loyalty.

Timeline
 1970 October: E10 goes on sale in Japan. At the beginning, were selling only four-door sedans and two-door sedans.
 With 1970: 17th Tokyo motor show, exhibiting the concept car "270X" which designates the Cherry as the base.
 1971 end of September: coupé version added
 1972 March: three-door van version added
 Cherry coupé debuts in 1972 April race Japan. As a Nissan works entry, it participated also in other domestic Japan races.
 1972 June: Revised model with updated grill, rear lights and hubcaps released. This was called the 1973 model year version in most markets.
 1973 March: debut of Cherry coupé 1200X-1 R with "fender flares"
 1976: Acropolis Rally privateer entry
 1977: E10 production ceases

Second generation (F10; 1974–1978) 

The second-generation Cherry was known as F-II in Japan and "Datsun F10" in North America. It was Nissan's first front-wheel-drive model to be sold in North America. Four-wheel independent suspension continued to be used. Sales of the F-II were generally disappointing, and the "Cherry" nameplate was retired in Japan after this generation.

The F10 was fitted with three types of inline four-cylinder Nissan A-series OHV engines:

  A10
  A12
  A14

A two-pedal type semi-automatic transmission was offered called the "Sportmatic", which used a torque converter obviating the need for a clutch.

In Europe, F10 was known as Datsun 100A F-II (with A10 engine) or 120A F-II (with A12 engine). The A12 powered 120A F-II was the most common model, with the coupe only being available in A12 format in the Uk where it sold in higher numbers.

In New Zealand the 100A 4-door sedan (1.0L A10 motor) was assembled from CKD kits as a price leader for the Datsun range – due to the choice of engine, it was the smallest engined car assembled in New Zealand, the engine (988 cc) being smaller than the Mini's 998 cc unit. Production continued well after the N10 model replaced it overseas, eventually being discontinued in late 1980, with the N10 5-door hatchback replacing it in 1981.

In USA, only the coupe and wagon were offered, and only with the 1.4-litre engine. In Canada, the two-door sedan was also available.

It was a strong seller on the UK market, although it did not launch there until 1976, due to the popularity of the original Cherry model there, and helped the Datsun brand maintain strong sales figures.

Timeline 
 1974 September: Sale started in Japan. Body styles included 2 and 4 door sedans, a coupe, and a 3-door wagon.
 1976 Coupe introduced in UK 
 1977 Hatchback introduced in UK
 1978: Swedish Rally privateer entry
 In May 1978 Nissan Pulsar (N10 type) appeared as a successor model to the Cherry, originally only as a four-door. The four-door Cherry F-II was discontinued, with the two-door and coupé following the corresponding additions to the Pulsar range in September 1978. At this time the Cherry name was discontinued on the Japan home market. It was finally replaced in Europe in March 1979.

Third generation (N10; 1978–1982) 

The N10 model Pulsar was introduced to Japan in May 1978, with European sales beginning in March 1979. While known as the Nissan Pulsar in Japan, it was called Cherry in Europe and many other export markets. The body styling was more boxy, and influenced by designs coming out of Europe at that time. It came at a time when small hatchbacks were enjoying rising sales across Europe, with the Ford Fiesta, Volkswagen Polo, Renault 5 and Fiat 127 being particularly popular, along with the General Motors product which was known in Britain as the Vauxhall Chevette and on the continent as the Opel Kadett City. It continued to sell well in Britain, and the most popular foreign car there in 1981. In the American market it was sold as the Datsun 310, slightly upscale from the old-fashioned rear wheel drive Datsun 210.

Engine choices were carried over from the previous model, consisting of Nissan's A-Series motor in 1.0 L, 1.2 L and 1.4 L forms. At some point, the A12 was replaced by the marginally larger A12A in export markets as well. Production of the N10 series ceased in mid-1982, to be replaced by larger N12 Cherry/Pulsar, which was sold in Europe from September 1982.

Fourth generation (N12; 1982–1986) 

The Cherry name was still used in Europe on the model N12, an angular, three- or five-door hatchback design which was introduced in September 1982. The new model was somewhat larger than earlier versions of the Cherry, with the new Micra taking its place in the supermini sector on its European launch in June 1983, leaving the Cherry to compete in Europe against the new-popular hatchback designs like the Ford Escort and Volkswagen Golf, while the Sunny gave buyers a traditional saloon and estate option.

While being somewhat larger, Nissan lowered the weight of the car by the new E-series engines being lighter than the ones used in the previous model, and through the extensive use of high-strength low-alloy steel (HSLA) as well. Further improving fuel economy were much improved aerodynamics, although at  they were no more than average for the segment. Occupant comfort was also improved through better seats and a redesigned suspension. Sound levels dropped as a result of the improved aerodynamics, advancements in door seal technology, and the use of a sandwiched firewall. An interesting feature was that the three-door's rear windows could be opened with two levers on the center console; these controlled the child safe rear locks on five-door versions.

A special model mainly sold in Europe was the one-liter E10-engined version. This was sold where tax regulations suited smaller engines, and was usually only offered with the lowest (DX) trim and a four-speed manual transmission. The little 1-liter engine had a higher fuel consumption figures than either the 1.3 or the 1.5, as it had to work a lot harder to keep up with traffic. A diesel model arrived in export markets in early 1983. In 1985 Belgian buyers also received a special edition combining the Japanese and the European names called the "Cherry Pulsar." This was a three-door Cherry DX 1.3 or 1.7 Diesel fitted with some extra equipment and painted light blue or silver metallic.

The turbocharged 1.5-liter model produces  at 5600 rpm in European trim.

A derivative of Cherry N12 was also built by Alfa Romeo at Pratola Serra, near Naples, Italy. The Alfa-built version was badged as the Alfa Romeo Arna but in the United Kingdom and Spain it was available through Nissan Dealers badged as the Nissan Cherry Europe. The Cherry Europe was only available as a three-door in two varieties; the base model 1.2 SL and a later performance version, the 1.5 GTi. It is distinguishable externally by slightly different rear light clusters and other minor changes. Under the skin it used Alfa Romeo Alfasud-based components including the engine, transmission, and front suspension. Rear suspension, brakes and the majority of body panel pressings came from Japan. Arna was an acronym meaning Alfa Romeo Nissan Autoveicoli. The Arna did not sell well and the partnership was not continued after the car's demise in 1987. 

The Arna was never sold in Japan but a domestic version of the N12 Nissan Pulsar, labelled the Nissan Pulsar Milano X1, made use of the Alfa Romeo connection in its publicity and was fitted with the same black and green interior as the Arna Ti or Cherry Europe GTi. The model was entirely N12 based though and featured the normal, transversely mounted Nissan E engine.

After the end of Cherry production, the Sunny was Nissan's only offering of this size in Europe, with the range launched in the autumn of 1986 including a hatchback as well as a saloon and the estate model carried over from the previous Sunny range. In America only the notchback coupé ("Pulsar NX") was offered for most of the N12's run although the three- and five-doors were sold for model year 1983 only.

Replacement by Nissan Sunny 
In most export markets, the Nissan Sunny name replaced the Cherry starting with the N13 Pulsar model. In certain markets such as Greece, however, the N13 Pulsar retained the "Cherry" nameplate.

In Japan and some Asian markets, the Pulsar name was used until N15 model. See the Pulsar entry for more information.

References 

Cherry
Cars introduced in 1970
Subcompact cars
Front-wheel-drive vehicles
Cars discontinued in 1986